Cheriya Lokavum Valiya Manushyarum is a 1990 Indian Malayalam-language comedy caper film directed by Chandrasekharan and written by T. A. Razaq and A. R. Murukesh from a story by Chandrasekharan. The film stars Mukesh, Innocent, Jagathy Sreekumar, Mamukkoya, Thilakan, and Sreeja. Cheriya Lokavum Valiya Manushyarum is the first Malayalam film to depict the psychedelic drug LSD.

Plot 

The story is about four thieves-turned-philanthropists, Abu, Balu, Rokky, Sugunan, starting from the time they were thieves. They cross paths by chance and join forces leading to a robbery attempt at a house that goes awry but leads to their reformation at the hands of the house owner who himself is a robber-turned-philanthropist. The plot also shows how Karunan spurs them into robbing the corrupt rich and giving to the poor, in the mould of Robin Hood, portraying two such gutsy episodes; first bringing to book a treacherous money lender Sunny and next an unscrupulous business man and drug-dealer Madhava Menon. The second episode culminates in the murder of an accomplice of Madhava Menon, Dr. Narendran, at the hand of one of the four heroes, but Karunettan owns up to the murder so as to exonerate him and let the good work continue.

Cast 
 Mukesh as Balu
 Innocent as Rokky
 Jagathy Sreekumar as Sugunan
 Mamukkoya as Abu
 Thilakan as Karunettan
 Sreeja as Neethu
 Babu Namboothiri as Madhava Menon
 Kollam Thulasi as Dr.Naredran
 Shivaji as Sunny
 Jagannathan as Servant
 Sreelatha Menon as Staff of Sunny Financiers
 Kavitha Thambi as Ambili, Menon's Daughter

Songs 
The songs for this movie were penned by Kaithapram Damodaran Namboothiri and was composed by Johnson.

 "Thoovennilavu": G. Venugopal, Sujatha Mohan
 "Athikkulangara Melam": M. G. Sreekumar, Sujatha Mohan

References

External links
 

1990 films
1990s Malayalam-language films
1990 comedy films
Cross-dressing in Indian films
Films scored by Johnson